El Alamo Airport is an airport  north-northwest of Vichuquén, a town in the Maule Region of Chile.

The airport is next to Lake Vichuquén, in a small valley that runs from the lake southeast to Vichuquén. The well marked runway has an uphill slope to the southeast, and has hilly terrain in all quadrants.

See also

Transport in Chile
List of airports in Chile

References

External links
OpenStreetMap - El Alamo
OurAirports - El Alamo
FallingRain - El Alamo Airport

Airports in Chile
Airports in Maule Region